The Penderwicks: A Summer Tale of Four Sisters, Two Rabbits, and a Very Interesting Boy is a children's novel by Jeanne Birdsall, published by Knopf in 2005. This was Birdsall's first book published and it inaugurated the Penderwicks series, whose fifth and final volume was published in 2018. Both The Penderwicks and its sequel The Penderwicks on Gardam Street (Knopf, April 2008) were New York Times Best Sellers. The remaining books in the series are The Penderwicks at Point Mouette, The Penderwicks in Spring, and The Penderwicks at Last. 

The novel was inspired by the kind of stories the author read when growing up,
The National Book Award citation compares the novel to Louisa May Alcott's Little Women and E. Nesbit's The Story of the Treasure Seekers.
The fictional setting is more modern than Alcott's or Nesbit's, although not clearly contemporary with Birdsall's writing. The style is similar to Alcott's books, like Little Women, Little Men, Jo's Boys, Under the Lilacs and Rose in Bloom. There are different leading characters throughout the series, like in the Sarah, Plain and Tall or Narnia series. Birdsall often refers to elements from classic literature, such as Emily of New Moon by Lucy Maud Montgomery.

Plot

The Penderwicks, a family of six, (four sisters, their father, and their dog) get lost on the way to Arundel Cottage, which they have rented for the summer, but find their way with the help of a tomato seller named Harry, and Cagney, the gardener at Arundel.
 
After getting to the cottage, Skye goes exploring on the grounds, and meets Cagney in the garden. They talk until Mrs. Tifton, the owner of Arundel, comes looking for Cagney, and he hides Skye in an urn. Mrs. Tifton tells Cagney that he needs to get rid of the Fimbriata rosebush that his uncle kept alive for 30 years, but Skye and Cagney decide to move the bush to a place near the cottage. When Skye leaves, she runs into Mrs. Tifton's son Jeffrey, and, not knowing who he is, warns him to stay out of the garden and insults Mrs. Tifton.

After telling Rosalind and Jane what happened, Rosalind decides they need to apologize to Jeffrey, and they send Jane to apologize on Skye's behalf the next day. Jane and Jeffrey quickly become friends.  Meanwhile, at the cottage, Rosalind and Skye attempt to bake cookies for Jeffrey, but when Cagney comes over with the Fimbriata, Rosalind goes to help him, leaving Skye in charge of the cookies.  Skye sets the oven to "broil" and goes upstairs, letting the cookies burn. When Rosalind finds them, Skye yells at her, calling Jeffrey a snob - just as Jeffrey and Jane approach the house.  Mr. Penderwick comes in and sends them all on a walk. Jeffrey takes them to see a neighboring farmer's bull, and Batty unknowingly wanders into its pen.  Skye, Jane, and Jeffrey manage to save her from being attacked, and swear not to tell Mr. Penderwick or Rosalind about the incident.  Later, everyone goes to Jeffrey's house for gingerbread.  The cook, Churchie, wants Jeffrey to invite the girls to his birthday party and helps the girls choose beautiful dresses from among Mrs. Tifton's old clothes. The birthday party turns out to be a disaster.  At dinner, Mrs. Tifton  begins to despise the girls, and afterward they find out that Mrs. Tifton is planning to marry her boyfriend Dexter Dupree, and is considering sending Jeffrey to a military academy a year earlier than she had previously intended to.

After the party, life at Arundel falls into a routine: Skye, Jane, and Jeffrey play soccer and practice archery almost every day, and after Cagney offers to let Batty meet his pet rabbits, she and Rosalind visit his apartment every morning. When Rosalind is too busy to take Batty one day, she goes to visit the rabbits herself, and after being scared by Mrs. Tifton, she accidentally lets one escape. She attempts to find him, but can't, and feeling upset because Cagney told her the rabbit would be killed by an animal if it got loose, she decides to walk back to her house. 

Hound the dog senses Batty is missing and runs away, with all the Penderwick sisters and Jeffrey following. He catches the escaped rabbit, and leads the older children to Batty, but right as they get to her, Batty walks into the street into the path of a car. Jeffrey pulls her out of the way. When the girls tell Mr. Penderwick what happened, he says that in some cultures, when a person saves another person's life, their souls are linked together.  

A few days later, when Skye, Jane, and Jeffrey are playing soccer together, they run into the Arundel gardens, forgetting that the Garden Club Contest was happening, and Mrs. Tifton had warned them to stay out of the garden that day. She furiously forbids Jeffrey to ever see the Penderwicks again, but when she and Dexter are out, Skye and Batty go to the Arundel mansion to check on him.  Dexter and Mrs. Tifton come home early and find Skye and Batty there. She kicks them out, but Skye goes back and listens to Mrs. Tifton lecturing Jeffrey to make sure he is okay. She overhears Mrs. Tifton call her sneaky and sarcastic and say that Rosalind is always following Cagney around like a lovesick puppy, and that if she continues, some man will "let himself be caught" and that will "end her innocence." Skye also hears that Mr. Penderwick is a pushover, she thinks Batty has a mental issue because of "her tacky wings and the odd way she stares without speaking," and that Mrs. Penderwick ran away from the family because she got tired of caring for all the girls.  Skye loses her self-control, storms into the room, and tells Mrs. Tifton that her mother is dead before leaving.

That night, Skye tells Rosalind everything that happened, including the part about Rosalind's obsession with Cagney.  Rosalind goes for a walk, sees Cagney with another girl, and falls into the pond, hitting her head on a rock. Cagney brings her home. Churchie calls Skye and tells her that Mrs. Tifton and Dexter took Jeffrey for an interview at the military school and delivers a message from Jeffrey telling Skye that it wasn't her fault.  That night, Jeffrey comes over to the cottage and tells the girls that he is running away.  He plans to stay with Churchie's daughter in Boston. Rosalind invites Jeffrey to stay with them for the night, and he accepts.

The next morning, Mrs. Tifton and Dexter come over to the cottage, trying to find Jeffrey.  Jeffrey explains to Mrs. Tifton that he doesn't want to go to Pencey, and she finally listens to him.  Even better, she lets him take a lesson at the Boston Music Conservatory.  In the end, the Penderwicks go home, and Jeffrey, the rabbits, and everyone else is happy, except that they have to leave each other.

Characters

Each chapter tells a third person omniscient, but focuses heavily on the point of view from each of the Penderwick sisters.
The four Penderwick girls have some similarities with the four March sisters from Little Women. 
Rosalind is the oldest, like Meg. Both are kind, responsible, and love flowers. 
Skye is a tomboy with a quick temper like Jo, though she is also neat and good at math. She is considered the most intelligent sister.
Jane is a writer, also like Jo, and a good soccer player. She is imaginative and has a tendency to "live in her own world."
Batty is the youngest sister. She is very shy and loves animals. Until the ending, she always wears a pair of butterfly wings, which Mrs. Tifton considers tacky.

Reception
It won the annual U.S. National Book Award for Young People's Literature (United States).

In 2012 it was ranked number 29 on a list of the top 100 children's novels published by School Library Journal.

References

External links

 Interview with Jeanne Birdsall at NPR.org
 nationalbook.org - about how the Penderwicks won the National Book Award
 Interview with Jeanne Birdsall at livejournal.com
 Review at goodtoread.org
 Jeanne Birdsall's own official website

2005 American novels
American children's novels
National Book Award for Young People's Literature winning works
Alfred A. Knopf books
Novels set in Massachusetts
Berkshires
Books by Jeanne Birdsall
2005 children's books